The 2001–02 All-Ireland Senior Club Football Championship was the 32nd staging of the All-Ireland Senior Club Football Championship since its establishment by the Gaelic Athletic Association in 1970-71. The championship began on 7 October 2001 and ended on 17 March 2002.

Crossmolina Deel Rovers entered the championship as the defending champions, however, they failed to qualify after being beaten in the Mayo County Championship.

On 17 March 2002, Ballinderry won the championship following a 2-10 to 0-09 defeat of Nemo Rangers in the All-Ireland final at Semple Stadium. It remains their only championship title.

Results

Connacht Senior Club Football Championship

Quarter-final

Semi-finals

Final

Leinster Senior Club Football Championship

First round

Quarter-finals

Semi-finals

Final

Munster Senior Club Football Championship

Quarter-finals

Semi-finals

Final

Ulster Senior Club Football Championship

Preliminary round

Quarter-finals

Semi-finals

Final

All-Ireland Senior Club Football Championship

Quarter-final

Semi-finals

Final

Championship statistics

Top scorers

Overall

In a single game

Miscellaneous

 Rathnew won the Leinster Club Championship for the first time in their history.
 Charlestown Sarsfields won the Connacht Club Championship title for the first time in their history.

References

2001 in Gaelic football
2002 in Gaelic football